During the 1996–97 English football season, Chelsea competed in the Premier League.

Season summary
With Glenn Hoddle leaving to become England manager, Chelsea gave the managerial role to midfielder Ruud Gullit, who used his continental connections to bring in world-class international players such as France center-back Frank Leboeuf, and Italian superstars such as midfielder Roberto Di Matteo, Parma's playmaker Gianfranco Zola and the Champions League winning striker and Juventus captain Gianluca Vialli. Gullit had a dream start to his managerial career as Chelsea won the FA Cup with a 2–0 win over Middlesbrough, ending Chelsea's 26-year trophy drought and making him the first foreign manager to win a major trophy with an English club. Zola was voted FWA Footballer of the Year after a brilliant first season at Stamford Bridge in which he scored 12 goals and contributed many assists, while fellow countryman and record £4.5 million signing Roberto Di Matteo scored one of Chelsea's goals in the triumphant Wembley final.

The club suffered a tragedy in late October when director Matthew Harding was killed in a helicopter crash in Cheshire when returning home from the club's League Cup exit at Bolton.

Final league table

Results summary

Results by round

Results

Premier League

League Cup

FA Cup

First team squad
Squad at end of season

Left club during season

Reserve squad

Statistics

|}

Transfers

In

Out

Transfers in:  £14,450,000
Transfers out:  £4,965,000
Total spending:  £9,485,000

References

Hockings, Ron. 100 Years of the Blues: A Statistical History of Chelsea Football Club. (2007)

Chelsea F.C. seasons
Chelsea